Christophe Guyot is a French motorcycle rider, French Superbike champion, 24 Hours of Le Mans winner and Endurance World champion. Born on July 13th, 1962 in Marseille, he manages the GMT94 motorcycle team, of which he has been the creator since its early days. He is also a consultant for the Eurosport television channel.

Biography 
Graduated as a teacher in 1984, Christophe Guyot taught until 1990. It was in 1989 that he started motorcycle racing in the 350cc Promosport category on a Yamaha RDLC. He created the Guyot Motorcycle Team (GMT) in 1991 and later became the president of the GMT94 association, affiliated to the FFM.

Christophe Guyot was also the representative of the riders from 1994 to 2004. He was then a member of the Executive Committee of the French Federation of Motorcycling (term of office 2004-2008 and 2012-2016).

He has always worn number 94, the symbol of a French department and with which it carries out projects for young people, road safety and the most penniless.

GMT94 is the official Yamaha team in the EWC (Endurance World Championship) until 2018. The team won 3 endurance world championship titles, 3 victories in the 24 Hours Motos and 2 victories in the Bol d'Or. It is also a four-time French Superbike champion. Today it is the official Yamaha team in the Supersport World Championship.

The rider years 
Christophe Guyot started motorcycle racing in 1989, at the age of 26.

For his first season of speed, in the Promosport 350 and behind the handlebars of a Yamaha RD 350 LC, he won two races and finished on the rostrum three times.

This year 1989 is a change in Christophe Guyot's life. Until then a teacher, he decided to leave school to concentrate on his passion: motorcycling. In 1990, he moved in the upper class and ride in Promosport 750, a category in which he won three victories. The following season, in 1991, Christophe Guyot decided to found his own team, GMT94 for Guyot Motorcycle Team, 94 being the French department number of Val-de-Marne. He raced for three seasons in the Superbike World Championship, accumulating a total of 16 races throughout the 1991, 1992 and 1993 seasons.

After three years of travelling the world, Christophe Guyot decided to return to France successfully since he won the title of French Superbike champion in 1998. He is still the only "private" rider to have won the championship in the top French speed category. The following year, he decided to devote himself exclusively to the Endurance World Championship.

From the very first races, the results were convincing: first podium (Portugal), first pole position in the world championship (Germany), and the title of runner-up world champion. The following year was the basis for the GMT94's first victory at the 24-hour race in Oschersleben (2000), Germany. 2001 is of the same! A new second place in the championship is highlighted by two victories including the famous 24 Hours Motos. In 2002, Christophe Guyot won the 8 Hours of Brno, Czech Republic.

Finally, during the 2004 season he became Endurance World Champion and offered Yamaha his first title in the category. The following season, Christophe Guyot announced that he was hanging up the leather to devote himself to new projects, still with GMT94. However, he remained a substitute until 2007 and competed again in a race in 2011, where he won, with his rider David Checa, the 5 Hours of Circuit Carole.

Team-Manager 
Christophe Guyot held this position long before his retirement from sport. Having had a remarkable 2004 season, Yamaha decided to provide "official" support to GMT94. It was in 2018 that he decided to partially enter the Supersport World Championship with Mike Di Meglio then with a young rider: Corentin Perolari. Afterwards, GMT94 ends its commitment to Endurance in order to devote itself fully to the Supersport World Championship. Thus, in 2019 and at the end of a successful season, GMT94 became runner-up in Supersport with Jules Cluzel and Corentin Perolari.

Consultant 
Since his retirement from sport, Christophe Guyot has been involved in a wide range of activities. In addition to his role as team manager, he is also a consultant for the Eurosport television channel on the Superbike World Championship (WSBK), Endurance and British Superbike. Between 2012 and 2018, when the channel then owns the broadcasting rights for MotoGP, he also delivered his analysis during the Dimanche Méca and Warm-up shows with Christophe Malbranque and Lionel Rosso.

Christophe Guyot is also involved with the Mutuelle des Motards in projects aimed at youth and has a role at Yamaha, a manufacturer to which he is loyal.

Principals triumphs

References

Living people
1962 births
French motorcycle racers